Fever 333 (or the Fever 333) is an American rock band formed in Inglewood, California, United States, in July 2017. The three-piece band was founded by former Letlive vocalist Jason Aalon Butler, former the Chariot guitarist Stephen Harrison and Night Verses drummer Aric Improta.

The band's debut extended play (EP), Made an America, was released on March 23, 2018. The group is signed to Roadrunner Records and 333 Wreckords. Their first LP Strength in Numb333rs was released a year later and its second EP Wrong Generation was released in 2020.

Career

2017–2019: Formation, Made an America and Strength in Numb333rs
Prior to the disbandment of Letlive, Jason Aalon Butler had met Travis Barker by chance, and decided to spend Super Bowl Sunday with him and John Feldmann. The trio spent the day discussing hip hop and afro-punk, which developed into building a concept together of what Butler described as "something a little dangerous that was subservice: musically and in ethos". By the time Letlive had broken up, Butler got in contact with Stephen Harrison, whose band the Chariot had disbanded a few years prior. Butler and Harrison discussed black people's participation in rock music and the concept for a band that Butler had previously dreamed up.

Fever 333 performed an impromptu pop-up show in a U-Haul truck in the parking lot of the bakery Randy's Donuts in Inglewood, California on July 4, 2017. The band performed three brand new unreleased tracks. Fever 333 members Jason Aalon Butler, Stephen Harrison, and Aric Improta hinted at the musical project and the show days prior to the midday performance. Butler posted a statement upon the announcement of the formation of Fever 333 in an Instagram post. "To those of you who want change, here is an offering to start that conversation. I've had a lot of people asking me what I'll be doing in the future—here is a taste of that." Butler continued, "I love art. I love being a musician. I love progress. And I am no stranger to pushing back if I feel it is necessary. This will be an exhibition of all the things I love w/ like minded people for whom I care deeply. To all the tired, frustrated, and brave, come join us." The band released its debut single, "We're Coming In", accompanied by a music video, which premiered on Alternative Press on August 25, 2017. On August 29, the band released another track, titled "Hunting Season", which features an uncredited guest appearance from Travis Barker. At the band's first headlining club show on August 31, 2017, and second concert overall, Blink-182 drummer Travis Barker made a surprise appearance performing on the song "Hunting Season" at The Roxy Theatre in West Hollywood. On November 3, 2017, the band released the song "Walking in My Shoes".

On March 23, 2018, Fever 333 released their debut extended play (EP), Made an America, without any prior announcement, on Roadrunner Records. Nathan Pike, Harrison's stepbrother and manager of 333 Wreckords, assisted with the US marketing efforts of the EP. On May 23, 2018, the band released a stand-alone single, "Trigger", regarding the topic of gun violence in the United States, accompanied by its music video. On September 28, 2018, the band released an official remix to their song "Made an America", featuring Barker and rapper Vic Mensa. A music video for the remix was also released on the band's official YouTube channel. Directed by Brandon Dermer, the black and white video sees vocalist Jason Butler performing in a warehouse, where he is joined by Mensa and Barker. In November 2018, the band was confirmed to serve as main support to Bring Me the Horizon on their United Kingdom and European arena tour later in the year.

On November 9, 2018, the band released the single "Burn It" along with announcing details of their debut album, Strength in Numb333rs, which was released on January 18, 2019. On December 7, 2018, the band received a Grammy nomination in Best Rock Performance for "Made an America". On May 29, 2019, they were featured on the song "Scary Mask", a single by Poppy. Its accompanying music video was directed by Titanic Sinclair. On November 3, 2019, the band released a new song called "Kingdom" on BBC Radio 1's Rock Show hosted by Daniel P. Carter. The song was released to stream the next day. On December 6, 2019, "Blow me", a single by The Used featuring the vocalist of Fever 333 Jason Aalon Butler is published.

2020–present: Wrong Generation and departure of Harrison and Improta
Following the May 25, 2020 murder of George Floyd, the band released Long Live the Innocent on June 3, a live political demonstration and musical performance. Proceeds were donated to the Minnesota Freedom Fund and Black Lives Matter. During the performance they debuted the unreleased song "Supremacy", which was officially released on June 8.

Fever 333 released the single Bite Back on October 19, 2020. On October 23, 2020, Fever 333 released their second EP titled, Wrong Generation.

On October 3, 2022, drummer Improta and guitarist Harrison announced via separate Instagram posts that they would be leaving the band. Improta stated that the decision was "layered, but ultimately, I'd just rather dedicate my time to projects that operate different than that one." Harrison cited creative differences and that "things were pretty bad internally" as part of their reason for leaving.

Musical style
Their music merges elements of punk rock and hip hop, which Butler has described as both being "rooted in subversion", citing musical influences such as Rage Against the Machine, Public Enemy and Black Flag. Their lyrics tackle politically and socially conscious themes such as racism, sexism and homophobia. Their music has been categorised as rap rock, rapcore, rap metal, post-hardcore, hardcore punk, and nu metal. Some of their songs also feature elements of trap music, and subsequently been categorised as trap metal. In article for Afropunk Festival's website, Butler stated that he believes "Punk rock and hip-hop are one-in-the-same. They’re always flying the flag of channeling art from discord", echoing a similar sentiment in an article for Colorado Springs Independent, by saying "[Fever 333's music is] like the evolution of guitar-based music. Because currently, hip-hop is really pushing the envelope sonically, as well as ideologically".

In a 2019 article for Kerrang!, writer Mischa Pearlman described their music as "a thrilling combination of post-hardcore and hip-hop with some of the catchiest melodies you’ll hear on any album from this year". In an article for Altcorner.com, writer Elizabeth Birt described them as "a riotous punk act... [that] have solidified a sturdy brand of protest punk as they take aim at the wrongs in the world but particularly in their homeland of America, not through violence but through angst-filled lyrics".

Political views and activism
The band espouse radical left-wing political views, in opposition to social inequality, capitalism and authoritarianism in both their lyrics and activism. The "333" in their name represents the three core principles that the members view the band to stand for: community, charity and change. In 2019 interview for Guestlist.net, Butler stated:

They are heavily inspired by the anti-racist, anti-imperialist and anti-fascist views of the Black Panther Party in addition to political activists such as Mahatma Gandhi, Angela Davis, James Baldwin and Ta-Nehisi Coates. In a 2019 interview for Kerrang!, Butler stated that they perceive that "[they are] speaking with the people, not for them".

They have also expressed disdain for the American electoral system, with Butler specifically stating that he doesn't believe the majority of politicians to stand for the betterment of the people in general, with voters generally only considered the effects their vote would have on themselves and disregarding those often less fortunate than them.

The group perceive their status as a band provides them with a platform to support to project their views to a wider audience and combat social injustice, citing that they are "trying to write the soundtrack to the revolution that we know is about to happen". In an article for Kerrang!, Butler said that:

Long Live the Innocent
Long Live the Innocent was a live streamed demonstration and performance by the band on June 3, 2020. It was a response to the murder of George Floyd by police on May 25 of the same year and represented the band's condemnation of both his specific killers, as well as police brutality and institutional racism in general. All proceeds were donated to the Minnesota Freedom Fund and Black Lives Matter. NME described the event a representation of solidarity with the communities also protesting Floyd's murder. In one speech that Butler gave during the event, he stated that:

Butler also criticised a number of high profile record labels and streaming services, including Atlantic Records, Sony Music, Spotify, Def Jam Recordings, Amazon and Apple Music, for not using their money to support the black community during this time, despite profiting off of black culture and music.

Imagery

The band's logo is a homage to the logo of the Black Panther Party, an American anti-racism and revolutionary socialist organisation that Butler has likened the band's practices to, as "black panthers do not strike unless they are pushed into a corner to where they have no way out". The homage was approved by the designer of the Black Panther's logo and their Minister of Culture Emory Douglas.

While performing live, Butler often wears a bulletproof vest with "333" across its chest. According to an article by Kerrang!, this is intended to present the American police force's increasing militarisation. Butler also often performs in a boilersuit, also featuring the groups iconography, along with a bag over his head, representing the human rights abuses in prisons such as Guantanamo Bay detention camp and Abu Ghraib prison.

Band members 
Current members
Jason Aalon Butler – lead vocals, guitars, bass, percussion (2017–present)

Former members
Stephen Harrison – guitars, backing vocals, bass, percussion (2017–2022)
Aric Improta – drums, percussion (2017–2022)

Discography

Studio albums
 Strength in Numb333rs (2019)

Accolades
Grammy Awards

|-
| align="center" | 2019
| "Made an America"
| Best Rock Performance
| 

Kerrang! Awards

|-
| align="center" | 2019
| "Burn It"
| Best Song
|

References

2017 establishments in California
African-American heavy metal musical groups
Hardcore punk groups from California
Musical groups established in 2017
Musicians from Inglewood, California
Rap metal musical groups
Rapcore groups
Trap metal musicians